Frank J. Gaffney Jr. (born April 5, 1953) is an American anti-Muslim conspiracy theorist and the founder and president of the Center for Security Policy. In the 1970s and 1980s, he worked for the federal government in multiple posts, including seven months as Acting Assistant Secretary of Defense for International Security Affairs during the Reagan administration.

Early life
Gaffney was born in Pittsburgh, Pennsylvania in 1953 to Virginia Gaffney (née Reed) and Frank J. Gaffney. His father was a classical music aficionado and long-time partner at the law firm of Thorp, Reed & Armstrong, which was founded by his wife's father, Earl Reed. (It merged in 2013 with Clark Hill PLC.) Gaffney's grandfather, Joseph Gaffney, was a city solicitor of Philadelphia. In the early twentieth century in that city, as a known Catholic, he faced opposition from nativist Protestant groups in the city alleged that Catholics were "gaining control of American institutions while rewriting the nation's history".

In 1975, Gaffney graduated from the Edmund A. Walsh School of Foreign Service of Georgetown University with a Bachelor of Science in Foreign Service. He received his graduate degree from Johns Hopkins University's Paul H. Nitze School of Advanced International Studies.

Career
Gaffney began his government career in the 1970s, working as an aide in the office of Democratic Senator Henry M. Jackson, under Richard Perle. From August 1983 until November 1987, Gaffney held the position of Deputy Assistant Secretary of Defense for Nuclear Forces and Arms Control Policy in the Reagan Administration, again serving under Perle.

In April 1987, Gaffney was nominated to the position of Assistant Secretary of Defense for International Security Affairs. He served as the acting Assistant Secretary for seven months. During this time, despite his official post, he was excluded by senior Reagan administration officials from the then-ongoing arms control talks with the Soviet Union. Gaffney was ultimately forced out of the Pentagon; The Washington Post observed at the time that within four days of Frank Carlucci's appointment as Secretary of Defense, "Gaffney's belongings were boxed and he was gone". Following his departure from government, he immediately set about criticizing Ronald Reagan's pursuit of an arms control agreement with the USSR.

Gaffney contributes to the conservative media site Newsmax. Gaffney wrote a column for The Washington Times from 2012 to 2016, and for Jewish World Review from 2000 to 2013. He is also the host of Secure Freedom Radio, a nationally-syndicated radio program and podcast which has featured guests such as Newt Gingrich, John R. Bolton, and white nationalist Jared Taylor. Gaffney is the vice-chair of the Committee on the Present Danger and has been described as part of a "new red scare" of anti-Chinese sentiment in the United States.

On December 12, 2020, at the far-right, pro-Trump Jericho March, Gaffney announced he was launching a new political party called the Great America Party (GAP). The GAP, Gaffney, and the Jericho March all claim, without evidence that the 2020 presidential election was stolen from Donald Trump.

Center for Security Policy

In 1988, Gaffney established the Center for Security Policy (CSP), a Washington, D.C.-based national security think tank that has been widely described as engaging in conspiracy theorizing by a range of individuals, media outlets and organizations. Its activities are focused on exposing and researching perceived jihadist threats to the United States. The Center has been described as "not very highly respected" by BBC News and "disreputable" by Salon. It has faced strong criticism from people across the political spectrum, but has also had its reports cited by political figures such as US President Donald Trump and former Congresswoman Michele Bachmann. CSP has been described as an "extremist think tank" by the Center for New Community. In 2016, the CSP was classified by the Southern Poverty Law Center (SPLC) as a hate group. The SPLC describes Gaffney as "one of America’s most notorious Islamophobes". Gaffney and the CPS have also been described as part of the counter-jihad movement.

On March 16, 2016, Republican presidential candidate Ted Cruz announced he would name Frank Gaffney to be one of his National Security Advisors. Cruz said that Gaffney "is a serious thinker who has been focused on fighting jidahists [sic], fighting jihadism across the globe".  In December 2015, Nation Institute Fellow Eli Clifton characterized as unscientific a CSP-funded poll that Donald Trump had been citing, which purportedly showed widespread support for Sharia law among U.S. Muslims and a need for intervention in that community. It added that, "Between Trump’s calls for a national registry of Muslims and a ban on Muslim immigration, it appears that through coincidence or outright collaboration, Trump is building an immigration and anti-Muslim policy framework that closely mirrors the statements and proposals advocated by" Gaffney and the CSP.

Gaffney has been associated with David Yerushalmi, who has served as legal counsel for the CSP, for being responsible in spreading misinformation about Islam and for encouraging the enactment of anti-Muslim laws, including anti-Sharia legislation in the United States.

Fax wars
In the 1990s, Gaffney became known in Washington, D.C. for "fax wars" he waged, whereby his "small but loyal following" would be encouraged to inundate the offices of members of Congress with faxes.

In 1995, Gaffney charged that US Secretary of Energy Hazel R. O'Leary was intentionally undermining US nuclear readiness; an analysis of Gaffney's charges against O'Leary published by William Arkin observed that Gaffney "specializes in intensely personal attacks" and his Center for Security Policy's liberal use of faxes to attack its opponents had made it the "Domino's Pizza of the policy business".

Later, in a 1997 column for The Washington Times, Gaffney alleged a seismic incident in Russia was a nuclear detonation at that nation's Novaya Zemlya test site, indicating Russia was violating the Comprehensive Test Ban Treaty (CTB).  (Subsequent scientific analysis of Novaya Zemlya confirmed the event was a routine earthquake.) Reporting on the allegation, the Bulletin of the Atomic Scientists observed that, following its publication, "fax machines around Washington, D.C. and across the country poured out pages detailing Russian duplicity. They came from Frank Gaffney", going on to note that during the first four months of 1997, Gaffney had "issued more than 25 screeds" against the CTB.

Conspiracy theories

Anti-Muslim attitudes

The Anti-Defamation League has said that Gaffney "has promulgated a number of anti-Muslim conspiracy theories over the years" and that he has "undue influence" relative to other like-minded figures.

According to the SPLC, Gaffney's beliefs stem "from a single discredited source – a 1991 fantasy written by a lone Muslim Brotherhood member that was introduced into evidence during the 2008 Holy Land Foundation trial in Dallas federal court. But to Gaffney, this document is a smoking gun, a mission statement pointing to a massive Islamist conspiracy under our noses". The ADL quotes Gaffney as "mentioning that in 1991, a Muslim Brotherhood operative produced the "explanatory memorandum on the general strategic goal of the group in North America." According to Gaffney, the memo explicitly addresses the progress the Muslim Brotherhood has made in building an infrastructure in the United States with the goal of destroying Western civilization from within so that Islam is victorious over other religions". Other commentators have suggested that Gaffney's propensity for conspiracy theories began earlier during his career in the Reagan administration, where after being denied a higher position, was convinced that Soviet agents within the United States government were blocking him.

Following John Bolton's appointment as National Security Advisor, Gaffney was criticised as the source of where Bolton's beliefs originated on a number of subjects. This included the Iran nuclear deal and many Islamic beliefs.

ACU dispute
In 2011, Gaffney was banned by the American Conservative Union from the Conservative Political Action Conference (CPAC). ACU chairman David Keene released a statement contending that Gaffney "has become personally and tiresomely obsessed with his weird belief that anyone who doesn't agree with him on everything all the time or treat him with the respect and deference he believes is his due, must be either ignorant of the dangers we face or, in extreme case, dupes of the nation's enemies". (Gaffney has since returned to CPAC to host panels at the conference in 2015 and 2016.)

In an April 2016 column in The Washington Times titled, "When conspiracy nuts do real damage", Keene again slammed Gaffney, writing, "One hopes that is what they will do and that Mr. Gaffney will, like the folks at Group Research, Mr. Hoover's aides and most conspiracy nuts of yore will vanish into the fever swamps from which he came". The column came two months after Gaffney unexpectedly left The Washington Times, where he was a staff columnist and Keene was the opinion editor. Keene, who had slashed the frequency of Gaffney's column from weekly to monthly, commented to Media Matters on Gaffney's departure, describing Gaffney's work as "well-researched," and stated, "we're sorry to lose him but we wish him well". Keene also noted that Gaffney had left without giving him any notice, saying, "I guess he's notifying us through you".

Media responses
Gaffney has been called a conspiracy theorist by Dave Weigel writing in Reason magazine; Steve Benen of MSNBC; Slate; and The Intercept, among others. Jacob Heilbrunn, editor of The National Interest, has described Gaffney as "plain creepy", while The Washington Post has reported that Gaffney's views were "considered radioactive by the Republican establishment", and Eli Clifton noted that Gaffney suffered "from a lack of mainstream acceptance." Democrats, and many Republicans, have called Gaffney a "conspiracy theorist".

Beliefs
Conspiracy theories Gaffney has promoted include:
 The belief that former Iraqi President Saddam Hussein was involved in the 1993 World Trade Center bombing and the Oklahoma City bombing.
 Gaffney has sought to have Republican Party strategist Grover Norquist excluded from CPAC because of his alleged ties to the Muslim Brotherhood. In 2011, Gaffney said of Norquist, "We are in a war, and he has been working with the enemy for over a decade." Responding to the accusation, the board of directors of the American Conservative Union unanimously condemned Gaffney's charges as "reprehensible" and "unfounded."
 He has opposed the building of a number of large religious Muslim sites in the United States, including Park51, also referred to as the Ground Zero Mosque. 
 Accusations that Hillary Clinton aide Huma Abedin is a secret agent of the Muslim Brotherhood. After the allegation was repeated by Michele Bachmann, US senators John McCain, Scott Brown, and Marco Rubio joined in dismissing it, and Speaker of the United States House of Representatives John Boehner said "accusations like this being thrown around are pretty dangerous."
 Accusations that Barack Obama is a Muslim who has secretly orchestrated "the most consequential bait-and-switch since Adolf Hitler", that General David Petraeus had "submitted to Sharia", that Congressman Keith Ellison is "likely to leak information to the Muslim Brotherhood", and that deputies in the Broward County, Florida, sheriff's office are "directly tied to Hamas.
 The belief that the logo of the US Missile Defense Agency is a coded indicator of "official U.S. submission to Islam" because it "appears ominously to reflect a morphing of the Islamic crescent and star with the Obama campaign logo".
 The belief that the responsibility-to-protect norm has been supported by the United States government to lay the groundwork for a forthcoming American military invasion of Israel.
 The belief that Muslim enemies of the United States are hidden in plain sight and organizing through mainstream Muslim rights organizations. He said of Muslims, “They essentially, like termites, hollow out the structure of the civil society and other institutions, for the purpose of creating conditions under which the jihad will succeed.”

Works

Books

Films
Gaffney was an executive producer of the documentary Islam vs. Islamists: Voices From the Muslim Center.

References

External links

 Secure Freedom Radio with Frank Gaffney Podcasts
 

1953 births
Living people
American columnists
American foreign policy writers
American male non-fiction writers
American political writers
American conspiracy theorists
Counter-jihad activists
Walsh School of Foreign Service alumni
Paul H. Nitze School of Advanced International Studies alumni
National Review people
Reagan administration personnel
The Washington Times people
United States Department of Defense officials